Saint-Céré (Languedocien: Sant Seren) is a commune in the Lot department, southern France. Its population is 3,414 (2019). The commune includes within its borders the castle of Saint-Laurent-les-Tours, where the artist Jean Lurçat lived and worked for many years, and from which he operated a secret radio for the French Resistance. The castle still houses a collection of his works.

Geography

Location
The town is located in the centre of a small metropolitan area, in the Quercy, northeast of the Causse de Gramat and west of Segala, between Lacapelle-Marival and Bretenoux, in the valley of the Bave, tributary of the Dordogne river, and on the northern edge of the Limargue. It is the city-centre of the urban unit of Saint-Céré.

Located at the crossroad of the routes to Limousin, Auvergne and Quercy, Saint-Céré is a sought after place to stay due to its location and an excellent point of departure for many walks and excursions in the Haut-Quercy.

Hydrography
The Bave river, a tributary of the Dordogne, flows through the town.

Geology and relief
The area of the commune is 1,133 hectares; its altitude varies from 141 to 523 meters.

At the town hall, the altitude of Saint-Céré is 155 meters. It rises from 141 meters at Bave river to 523 meters in the southern part of the commune.

Climate
Saint-Céré has the distinction of being at the junction of the three types of temperate climates: there is a Temperate Oceanic climate, with Mediterranean and Continental influences, characterised by a dry and hot summer, a sunny autumn, a mild winter. In the shelter of the foothills of the Massif Central, the Vent d'Autan is here moderate.

Toponymy
Saint-Céré is based on the Christian hagiotoponym of Serenus of Marseille.

During the French Revolution, the commune bore the name of Franc-Céré and Sen Céré (or Seu-Céré).

In Occitan, the name of the municipality is Sant Seren.

Population

Local culture and heritage
 La place du Mercadial, its fountain and the 15th century Consuls' House, which was declared a historic monument in 1991
 L'hôtel de Puymule, 15th-century, was listed as a historical monument in 1929
 L'hôtel de Miramon
 La maison consulaire
 Several wood-panelled houses
 Église Sainte-Spérie, dating from the 10th century, inscribed as a historical monument in 1979
 Église des Récollets, 17th century, listed as a historic monument in 1973
 Statue of Marshal Canrobert
 Statue of Charles Bourseul (1924) by Giovanni Pinotti Cipriani (also sculptor of the monument to the dead in the square of the Place de la République)
 Château de Montal, 14th-century, listed as a historical monument in 1909. The domain is partly located in the commune of Saint-Jean-Lespinasse.

See also
Communes of the Lot department

References

Saintcere
Quercy